The Chief of the Naval Staff (French: Chef d’état-major de la Marine, acronym: CEMM) is a French general officer, adviser to the Chief of the Defence Staff for the French Navy and responsible to the Minister of the Armed Forces for preparing the Navy for its engagement. Since 1 September 2020, the Chief of the Naval Staff has been Admiral Pierre Vandier.

Main powers 
The Chief of the Naval Staff is the top representative of the French Navy.

He advises and assists the Chief of the Defence Staff. He provides him with Navy-specific expertise.

He maintains bilateral relations with foreign navies. He participates in inter-administrative bodies in the field of State action at sea.

He has authority over the Navy General Staff (French: Etat-major de la Marine, acronym: EMM), over the Navy Military Personnel Directorate (French: Direction du personnel militaire de la Marine, acronym: DPMM), as well as over all the commands, directorates and services that make up the French Navy.

He ensures the preparation of the naval forces. As such, he is responsible for instruction and training, as well as maintenance of operational readiness. He develops the concepts and doctrines for the employment of naval forces. He reports to the Chief of the Defence Staff on the availability of assets and the operational readiness of the naval forces.

Regarding capabilities, the Chief of the Naval Staff develops the French Navy's military requirements. He defines support and infrastructure needs. He is responsible for the operational evaluation of new equipment. He decides their commissioning and their withdrawal from service at the end of their life.

In terms of human resources, regarding the military personnel of the French Navy, he is responsible for their recruitment, initial and continuous training, discipline, morale and wellbeing, professional and career paths, as well as management of the workforce, jobs and skills. Regarding civilian personnel under his authority, he expresses the needs in terms of employment, manpower and skills. He takes part in the implementation of the ministerial policy concerning civilian personnel and participates in social dialogue bodies.

He has responsibilities in terms of risk management and nuclear safety.

Authority and command 
The authority of the Chief of the Naval Staff is exercised over several bodies:

 The Navy General Staff provides general management for the following entities, under the direction of the Major General of the Navy (French: Major général de la Marine, acronym: MGM) and through its seven bureaux (performance and synthesis, support and finance, plans and programs, naval air operations, international relations, nuclear affairs and risk management, human resources):
 Navy Military Personnel Directorate, headed by a Vice-Admiral (acronym: DPMM);
 Major force commands:
 Vice-Admiral "ALFAN", commanding the Naval Action Force (FAN);
 Vice-Admiral "ALFOST", commanding the Strategic Oceanic Force (FOST);
 Commodore "ALAVIA", commanding the naval aviation force (AVIA);
 Commodore "ALFUSCO", commanding the force of marines and commandos (FORFUSCO);
 Maritime zone commanders:
 Vice-Admiral, maritime prefect of the Mediterranean;
 Vice-Admiral, maritime prefect of the Atlantic;
 Vice-Admiral, maritime prefect of the English Channel and the North Sea;
 Commodore "ALPACI", commanding the French Pacific Fleet and the armed forces in French Polynesia;
 Commodore "ALINDIEN", commanding the Indian Ocean Maritime Zone (ZMOI) and the French Maritime Forces in the Indian Ocean;
 Commodore "COMSUP FAA", commanding the French Armed Forces in the West Indies.
 The following services and departments:
 Inspectorate of the Navy (not to be confused with the General Inspectorate of the Armed Forces, which reports to the Minister of the Armed Forces);
 Navy Outreach Delegate;
 Permanent Commission for Fleet Vessel Programs and Testing;
 Navy Centre for Strategic Studies;
 Navy Public Relations Office (SIRPA Marine);
 Navy Logistics Service;
 Permanent Council for Boating Safety of the Navy;
 Permanent Council for Air Safety of the Navy;
 Permanent Secretariat of the Council for the Military Services of the Navy;
 Inspector of the health service for the Navy;

He chairs the board of directors of the Hydrographic and Oceanographic Service of the Navy (French: Service hydrographique et océanographique de la Marine, acronym: SHOM) and supervises the French Naval Academy on behalf of the Minister of the Armed Forces.

History 
Before the First World War, the Chief of the Naval Staff was above all the head of the military cabinet of the Minister of the Navy, and this mode of operation is the source of the name used; the officer who had effective authority over the Navy was then the admiral commanding the naval army, sometimes unofficially referred to as "amiralissime", in reference to the title of "généralissime" used at the time in the Army.

The First World War called all this into question, because an immense work of reorganisation had to be carried out at the headquarters in "rue Royale"a to conduct a long-lasting industrial maritime war and to be able to face the new threats posed by German submarines and underwater mines: a sort of "second staff" was even created, called the "directorate general for underwater warfare" (French: Direction générale de la guerre sous-marine, acronym: DGGSM) with sometimes overlapping areas of action; this observed redundancy logically led to the dissolution of the DGGSM at the end of the war and the attribution of its many prerogatives to the offices of the Navy General Staff.

In order to have a system allowing a flexible transition between peacetime — period of preparation — and wartime — period of action — the Vice-Admiral Chief of the Navy General Staff becomes, in the 1920s, the designated commander of the French maritime forces in the event of war, and the staff tasks fall in such circumstances to the Major General of the Navy, his first deputy in time of peace.

From 26 August 1939 to 6 June 1943, the organisation of the French Navy no longer included a general staff, but instead a "staff of the French maritime forces" which acted as such for the time of war. Admiral Darlan thus became commander-in-chief of the French maritime forces before being called to other functions in February 1941 in Vichy France.

After the Second World War, the gradual disappearance of the portfolio of Minister of the Navy led to entrusting part of the Minister's prerogatives to the Chief of the Naval Staff. However over time these prerogatives were taken over at the "joint" level by the staff of the armed forces and its chief: the Chief of the Defence Staff. The Chief of the Naval Staff thus lost his responsibilities for directing maritime operations to the Chief of the Defence Staff in 1971b.

In the 2000s, a large part of the organic prerogatives – force preparation – was again transferred to the Chief of the Defence Staff, but the Chief of the Naval Staff remained his main adviser regarding the preparation and employment of the Navy.

Admiral Bernard Louzeau decided at the end of the 1980s to replace the emblem of the French Navy, "a gold anchor intertwined with a cable", by a logo representing "a white ship’s bow with two blue and red waves". Admiral Pierre-François Forissier decided to provide the Navy with an anthem whose lyrics were written in 2011 by Lieutenant Christian Beauval and the music by the Chief of Music of the Armed Forces Didier Descamps, Chief of Music of the Brest fleet crews.

List of chiefs 
The following is a list of chiefs that served under the Third Republic, the French State, the Fourth Republic and the Fifth Republic:

Third Republic

French State

Fourth Republic

Fifth Republic

See also
Chief of the Defence Staff
Chief of Staff of the French Army
Chief of Staff of the French Air Force
Special Operations Command
Directorate General of the National Gendarmerie

Notes

References

External links 
Marine nationale The functions of the Chef d'état major de la marine on the French Navy site

Military of France
French military staff
 
France